R. Sundarrajan is an Indian director, actor and writer for Tamil language films. Active primarily in the 1980s and the 1990s as a film maker, he appeared more often as an actor thereafter.

Career
He has served as an actor, filmmaker and a renowned director. He is very well appreciated and a name of honor in Tamil film industry. Sundarajan is known for his silver jubilee films such as Payanangal Mudivathillai (1982), Vaidehi Kathirunthal (1984), Rajadhi Raja (1989), Thirumathi Palanisamy (1992) and many others. Sundarrajan's last movie directed was in the year 2013 Chithirayil Nilachoru.

Personal life 
Sundarrajan is married to Durga, a dubbing artist. They had three sons: Ashok, Karthik and Deepak. Karthik died in 2004 in an road accident. Deepak made his directorial debut in 2021 with Annabelle Sethupathi. Ashok acted in his father's directorial Chithirayil Nilachoru (2013).

Partial filmography

As director

As actor

As writer

As lyricist

As Serial Actor

References

External links 

1955 births
20th-century Indian film directors
20th-century Indian male actors
21st-century Indian film directors
21st-century Indian male actors
Indian film directors
Living people
Male actors in Tamil cinema
Tamil comedians
Tamil film directors
Tamil-language film directors